Guzik may refer to:

Places
 Guzik, Shenetal
 Guzik, Shepiran

People
 Guzik (surname), surname

Company 

 Guzik Technical Enterprises - Mountain View, California based tech company, guzik.com